Cries from Casement as His Bones are Brought to Dublin is a radio play written by David Rudkin that examines the life and controversial legacy of Irish nationalist and British diplomat Roger Casement. It was first broadcast on BBC Radio on 4 February 1973.  

The project began in 1966 as a commission for Rudkin to contribute to a radio series on historical rebels, and morphed into a play about Casement when he realised that the social and political climate of the country at the time bore strong parallels to that of Casement's era.

The BBC broadcast of the play, on 4 February 1973, was produced by John Tydeman and starred Norman Rodway as Roger Casement. Other members of the cast include:  Joan Bakewell, Sean Barrett, Kate Binchy, Michael Deacon, William Eedle, Kevin Flood, Martin Friend, Heather Gibson, David Gooderson, Sheila Grant, Michael N. Harbour, John Hollis, Fraser Kerr, Rolf Lefebure, Peggy Marshall, Meryl O'Keefe, Irene Prador, David Rudkin, Henry Stamper, Eva Stuart, John Tusa, David Valla, Mary Wimbush, and Joy Worth.  

An experimental stage version was performed by the Royal Shakespeare Company later that same year.

Professor David Ian Rabey has described the play as "astonishing" and "regrettably overlooked".

References

1973 plays
British radio dramas